Superimposition is the placement of one thing over another, typically so that both are still evident.

Superimposition or superimposed may also refer to:

 Adhyasa, a Sanskrit term for the superimposition or false attribution of properties of one thing on another thing
 Superimposition (album), an album by American pianist Eddie Palmieri
 Superimposed (band), an indie metal band

See also
 Superimposed code
 Superposition (disambiguation)